Julius Roger (23 February 1819 – 7 January 1865) was a German medical doctor, entomologist, and folklorist who worked in Ratibor, in Upper Silesia, most notable for having arranged (and raised the necessary monies) to build hospitals in Groß Rauden, Pilchowitz, and the current public hospital in Rybnik.

He is also notable for collaborating with entomologist Ernst Gustav Kraatz, contributing to  Kraatz's founding of the German Entomological Institute collections; for identifying and discovering over 400 new species of beetles and other insects; and for collecting folk songs (a collection of 546 songs - huntsmens songs, pastoral and farmers songs, Gypsy songs, ballads, and love songs).

His zoological author abbreviation is Roger.  For taxa authored, see Category:Taxa authored byJulius Roger, and this query.

References

1819 births
1865 deaths
19th-century German physicians
German entomologists
People from Heidenheim (district)
German folklorists
Ludwig Maximilian University of Munich alumni
Physicians from Baden-Württemberg